Gagnebina is a genus of flowering plants in the family Fabaceae. It belongs to the mimosoid clade of the subfamily Caesalpinioideae.

References

Mimosoids
Fabaceae genera
Taxa named by Noël Martin Joseph de Necker